Admiral Sir Alfred Leigh Winsloe,  (25 April 1852 – 16 February 1931) was a Royal Navy officer who went on to be Commander-in-Chief, China Station.

Early life
Winsloe was born in Pitminster, Somerset, the son of Richard Winsloe and Maria Louisa Jack. He was a first cousin of Margaret Asquith, Countess of Oxford and Asquith, whose mother was Emma Winsloe, his father's younger sister.

Naval career
Winsloe joined the Royal Navy in December 1865. He was made Commander of the Cruiser Squadron in 1900, and then commanded HMS Ophir during the Royal Tour of the Duke and Duchess of Cornwall and York (later King George V and Queen Mary) March–October 1901. When the tour had concluded, Winsloe was created a Companion of the Order of St Michael and St George (CMG) in the 1901 Birthday Honours, and a Commander of the Royal Victorian Order (CVO) in December 1901.

On his return to the Cruiser squadron in late 1901, he was posted as Commodore, 2nd class, in command of the cruiser HMS St George. Under his command, the St George took part in the fleet review at Spithead on 16 August 1902 for the coronation of King Edward VII, and in September that year was part of a squadron visiting Nauplia and Crete for combined manoeuvres in the Mediterranean Sea. He paid her off at Portsmouth on 15 November 1902.

In 1904 he became Commander of the Torpedo and Submarine Craft Flotillas. He went on to become Fourth Sea Lord in 1907 and Commander-in-Chief, China Station in 1910. He was appointed a Knight Commander of the Order of the Bath in the 1909 Birthday Honours. He retired in 1913.

He died in 1931.

References

|-

1852 births
1931 deaths
Royal Navy admirals
Knights Commander of the Order of the Bath
Companions of the Order of St Michael and St George
Commanders of the Royal Victorian Order
Lords of the Admiralty
Military personnel from Somerset